The 1974 Camden Council election took place on 2 May 1974 to elect members of Camden London Borough Council in London, England. The whole council was up for election and the Labour party stayed in overall control of the council.

Background

Election result

Ward results

Adelaide

Belsize

Bloomsbury

Camden

Chalk Farm

Gospel Oak

Grafton

Hampstead Town

Highgate

Holborn

Kilburn

King's Cross

Priory

Regent's Park

St John's

St Pancras

Swiss Cottage

West End

References

1974
1974 London Borough council elections